Crowd Favorites is the eighth studio album by bluegrass musician Claire Lynch. The album is a collection of previously released tracks along with four new tracks released on Rounder Records, three of which were originally from Lynch's time with the Front Porch String Band. Contributing artists on the album include Missy Raines, Jason Thomas, Jim Hurst, Rob Ickes, and Larry Lynch. The album reached No. 10 on the Bluegrass Album chart in Billboard magazine.

Track listing

Chart performance

References

2007 albums
Claire Lynch albums
Rounder Records albums